Grand Ayatollah Syed Ali Naqi Naqvi (born 26 December 1905 – 18 May 1988) (26 Rajab 1323 AH – 1 Shawal 1408 AH), also known as Naqqan Sahib, was a Twelver Shia Marja, thinker, poet, writer, jurist and Qur'anic interpreter. He is famous for his writings in Urdu, including the most famous Shaheed-e-Insaniyat and Tareekh-e-Islam. He has also written Tarjuma wa Tafseer of Quran e majeed and dozens of books in Arabic.

One of the most highly regarded scholars of Shia Islam at his time, he wrote more than 100 books and 1000 short books. His books were published by him in 12 languages in India. He is among the most learned Islamic scholars in Indian History.

Ayatullah ‘Ali Naqi Naqvi is arguably the single most important religious figure of the twentieth century Indian Shi’ite Islam. Emerging out of a very well-known family of traditional scholars and the seminaries of India and Iraq, his religious and intellectual career lasted several decades during which he remained prolific and continuously preached from the pulpit.
 
During his life he wrote and spoke about a host of subjects: the reason-revelation divide, a defense of Islam from attacks on its core beliefs and practices, Qur'anic exegesis, theology, defense of Shi’ite theology and religious practices from sectarian polemics, Islamic history, Islamic political and social thought, explanation of the various rulings of Islamic law, and the theme of Karbala and the martyrdom of Husayn.

Conscious of his role as the most learned juridical authority (marja al-taqlid) to whom the community would turn to in times of crisis, for ‘Ali Naqvi, in his life the greatest crisis facing the community was that of irreligiosity, of people losing confidence and conviction in the worth of religion for human civilization.

Early life and education 

Naqvi was born in 1905 in Lucknow, British India. Between the ages of 3 and 4 in 1327 Hijri, his father Syed Abul Hasan Naqvi (Mumtaz al-ulama) took him and his family to Iraq. His 'Bismillah' at the age of seven in Rauza-e-Imam Ali in Najaf, Iraq. In Iraq at the age of 7, Ali Naqvi's formal education began with Arabic and Persian grammar and basic learning of the Qur’an.

In 1914, the family returned to India and he continued his religious education under the supervision of his father and later at the Sultan al-Madaris seminary. He also studied Arabic literature with Mufti Muhammad ‘Ali.

In 1923 he passed the exam for certification of religious scholar (alim) from Allahabad University and soon also gained certification from Nazamiyyah College and Sultan al-Madaris.

In 1925 he was awarded a degree in literature (Fazil-i adab).

In 1927, Ali Naqvi departed for the seminaries of Iraq. During his stay there, he studied Islamic jurisprudence and Islamic theology (Kalam). 
While studying in Iraq Ali Naqvi also wrote a few works in Arabic. He had already written and published four books before his journey to Iraq

Rooh Aladab Sharah Alamiyatal Arab
Albait Al Mamoor Fi Emaratal Qubur
Faryaad e Musalmanane Aalam
Altawae Haj Per Sharaee Nuqtae Nazar Se Bahas

His first book published in Arabic was in Najaf during his days as a student and was the first ever book to be written against Wahabis, it is called "Kashf annaqab ann aqaaed Abdul Wahab Najdi".
His second book in Arabic was in defence of the act of "Matam, by the name of "Aqalatalaashir fi eqamatalshaaer".

He studied Islamic jurisprudence with Ayatullah Na’ini, Ayatollah Abu Hasan Isfahani and Ayatullah Sayyid Diya’ Iraqi, Hadith with Shakyh ‘Abbas Qummi and Sayyid Husayn Sadr and Islamic theology (Kalam) with Sayyid Sharf al-Din, Shaykh Muhammad Husayn Kashif al-Ghita’, Shaykh Jawad Balaghi, Sayyid Muhsin Amin Amli. After completing his seminary education and receiving certification (ijaza’) for ijtihad. He became a mujtahid at the age of 27. He was given ijazah by Ayatollah Naaini.

Career 
In 1932 Ali Naqvi returned to India. Immediately upon his return he began preaching regularly on Fridays.

In 1933 he was appointed as professor in the Oriental College Department of Lucknow University, where he then taught Arabic and Persian for over two decades.

In 1959, Aligarh Muslim University invited Ali Naqvi to take up the position of Reader in the theology (diniyat) department—which as yet did not have teaching faculty. The department also created two parallel streams of Sunni and Shi’i theology and Ali Naqvi began to oversee the affairs of the Shi’i branch.

Between 1967 and 1969, ‘Ali Naqvi became the dean of Shi’i theology eventually retiring from the university in 1972.

Post-retirement, from 1972 to 1975 Ali Naqvi was given a research professorship through the University Grants Commission (UGC) and he decided to permanently stay in Aligarh.

Majalis in Pakistan 
Ayatollah Ali Naqi Naqvi (Naqqan Sahib) visited Pakistan for the first time in 1954 to address majalis in Lahore. These included Imam Bargah Gulistan-e-Zahra (sa), 6-B Model Town, Jamia Muntazir, and Jamia Masjid Krishan Nagar. His topics included jihad, Shariat Nahi Badalti (Divine Law cannot be changed), Characteristics of Islam, Philosophy of Examinations, and Lives of Martyrs.

He visited again in 1979, with the efforts of Syed Kalbe Sadiq of India, to address all the majalis in Karachi.

From 1980 to 1984, he addressed majalis in other Pakistani cities including Lahore, Islamabad, Rawalpindi, Gujranwala, Faisalabad, Multan, Sialkot and Hyderabad.

Topics he spoke on during these years included Sajda e Shuker, Surah Jumah, the difference between killing and martyrdom, Ayat e Tatheer, Jihad, Sabar aur Ismat (Jihad, Patience and Innocence), and Tawassul e Abul Aaimah.

Majalis addressed on state television 
Ayatollah Ali Naqi Naqvi addressed majalis for Pakistan Television Corporation in 1983 and 1984, both times on the 8th of Muharram. His topics were Miyaar e Wafa (Height of Loyalty) and Aman e Aalam (Peace for the Universe) respectively.

Pakistan Television telecasts his recorded majalis every year in first ten days of muharram.

Later Years 
Ayatollah Ali Naqi (Naqqan Sahib) did not visit Pakistan after 1984 due to his old age and illness. He died due the effects of a stroke at the age of 83 in Lucknow on Eid-ul-Fitr.

Publications 
Ayatollah Ali Naqi Naqqvi was founder of Imamia Mission, Lucknow. Through this organization, several books were published. 
The following is only a partial list of works by Ayatollah Ali Naqi Naqvi:

 Alami Mushkilat ka hal	in Shu‘a-i ‘Amal (Jul 2009): 30–39 	
 Amar senani   		(Pdf Hindi)
 Aseeriye ahl e haram   		(Pdf Urdu)
 Ashk-i matam 	Lucknow: Sarfaraz Quaumi Press, 1957. 	
 Asiri-yi ahl-i haram 	Lucknow: Sarfaraz Quaumi Press, 1940. 	
 Aurat awr Islam	in Shu‘a‘-i ‘Amal (May 2009): 6–13 	
 Azaey Hussain azadari   		(Pdf Urdu)
 Aza-yi Husayn ki ahamiyat 	Lucknow: Sarfaraz Quaumi Press,1959. 	
 Aza-yi Husayn par tarikhi tabsarah. 	Lucknow: Sarfaraz Quaumi Press, np. 	
 Baitullah aur Ali ibne Abi Talib   		(Pdf Urdu)
 Bani umayyah ki adavat-i-Islam ki mukhtasir tarikh 	Lucknow: Imamiyah Mission, 1994. 	
 Booey-gul   		(Pdf Urdu)
 Frooe-deen   		(Pdf Hindi)
 Ghufranmab Maulana Syed Dildar Ali Sahab   		(Pdf Urdu)
 Hamaray rusum va quyud 	Lucknow: Sarfaraz Qaumi Press, 1939. 313 	
 Hamari rasmein aur bandishein   		(Pdf Hindi)
 Haqeeqat-e-sabr   		(Pdf Urdu)
 Hayat-i qaumi 	Lucknow: Imamia Mission, 1941 	
 Hazrat ‘Ali ki shakhsiyat: ‘Ilm aur a‘taqad ki manzil par 	Lucknow: Sarfaraz Qaumi Press, 1969. 	
 Husayn aur Islam 	Lucknow: Manshurah Imamiyah Mission, 1931. 	(Pdf Hindi)
 Husayn Husayn aik tarruf 	Lucknow: Sarfaraz Quaumi Press, 1964. 	
 Husayn ka atam balaydan 	Lucknow: Sarfaraz Quqmi Press, 1936. 	
 Husayn ka paygham ‘alam-i insaniyat kay nam 	Lucknow: Sarfaraz Quqmi Press, 1959 	(Pdf Urdu)
 Husayn ki yad ka azad Hindustan say mutalbah 	Lucknow: Sarfaraz Qaumi Press, 1950 	
 Husayni iqdam ka pahla qadam 	Lucknow: Sarfaraz Qaumi Press, 1953. 	
 Ibadat aur tariqi ibadat, 2nd ed. 	Lucknow: Nizami Press, np. 	
 Ilahiyaat ke 100 masael wa naghma-e-tauheed   		(Pdf Urdu)
 Imam Hussain ka shaheed hona aur Islami samvidhan ki raksha   		(Pdf Hindi)
 Insaniyat ka mujassema   		(Pdf Hindi)
 Iqalat al-athir fiiqamat al-sha'a'ir al-Husayniyah 	Najaf: Matba‘ah Haydariyyah, 1929. 	
 Isbat-i pardah 	Lahore: Imamia Mission, 1961. 	
 Islam aur Tijarat		
 Islam deen-e-amal hai   		(Pdf Hindi)
 Islam ka paygham pas-uftadah aqwam kay nam 	Lucknow: Imamiah Mission, 1936.	
 Islam ka tarz e zindagi		
 Islam ki hakimana zindagi   		(Pdf Urdu)
 Islam ki hakimanah zindagi 	Lucknow: Imamiyah Mission, 1935. 	
 Islami culture kia hay? 	Lahore: Imamiyah Mission, 1960. 	
 Islami tahzeeb   		(Pdf Hindi)
 Jadid tuhfatul avam 	Lahore: Iftikhar Book Depot, np. 	
 Janab-e-zainab ki-shakhsiyat   		(Pdf Hindi  /  Pdf Urdu)
 Jehad-e-mukhtar   		(Pdf Hindi)
 Karbal ke dukhit-Hussain   		(Pdf Hindi)
 Karbala ka tarikhi vaqi‘ah mukhtasar hay ya tulani? 	Lucknow: Sarfaraz Qaumi Press, 1960. 	
 Karbala ki yadgar payas	Lucknow: Sarfaraz Qaumi Press, 1959. 	
 Khilafat-i Yazid kay muta‘alliq azad ara’in 	Lucknow: Imamiyah Mission, 1953. 	(Pdf Urdu)
 Khuda ki ma‘rafat   	Lucknow:  Imamiyah Mission, 1938. 	
 Khutbaat-e-Karbala   		(Pdf Hindi   /   Pdf Urdu
 Khutbat-i Sayyidul ‘ulama’ muta‘lliq karnama-yi Husayn 	Lucknow: Idarah-yi Payam-i Islam, np. 	
 La tufsidu fi alard. 3rd ed. 	Lucknow: Imamiyah Mission, 1998. 	
 Ma‘rakah-yi Karbala 	Lucknow: Sarfaraz Qaumi Press, 1935. 	
 Majmu‘ah-yi taqarir. 5 vols. 	Lahore: Imamiyah Kutubkhana, np. 	
 Maqalat-i Sayyidul ‘ulama’ 	Lucknow: Imamiyah Mission, 1996. 	
 Maqam-e-Shabbiri   		(Pdf Hindi)
 Maqsad-i Husayn 	Lucknow: Sarfaraz Qaumi Press, 1956. 	
 Mas’alah-yi hayat an-nabi aur vaqi‘ah-yi vafat-i rusul 	Lucknow: Imamiyah Mission, 1973. 	
 Masa’il va dala’il 	Lucknow: Sarfaraz Qaumi Press, 1944. 	
 Masalae-Hayat un-Nabi (sawa) aur waqae wafate-Rasool (sawa)   		(Pdf Urdu)
 Mawlud-e-Ka‘bah 	Lucknow: Sarfaraz Qaumi Press, np. 	(Pdf Hindi)
 Mazhab aur ‘aql 	Lucknow: Sarfaraz Quqmi Press, 1941. 314 	
 Mazhab shi‘ah aik nazar main 	Lucknow: Imamiyah Mission, 1970. 	(Pdf Urdu)
 Mazhab-e-shia aur tableegh   		(Pdf Urdu)
 Mazhab-o-aqil   		(Pdf Hindi)
 Mazlum-i Karbala 	Lucknow: Imamiyah Mission 1941. 	
 Meraj-e-insaniyat – Hussain   		(Pdf Hindi)
 Meyar-e-falah wa najat   		(Pdf Urdu)
 Mi‘raj-i insaniyat: sirat-i rasul aur al-i rasul ki roshni main 	Lucknow: Imamiyah Mission, 1969	
 Mohabbate Ahle-bayt aur itaat   		(Pdf Urdu)
 Mujahidah-yi Karbala 	Lucknow: Imamiyah Mission, 1933. 	
 Muqaddamah-yi tafsir-i Qur’an 	Lucknow: Idarah ‘Ilmiyah and Nizami Press, 1940. 	
 Muqaddema Nahjul-balagha   		(Pdf Urdu)
 Musalmanon ki haqeeqi aksariyat   		(Pdf Urdu)
 Muslim personal law – Na qabil-i tabdil 	Lucknow: Imamia Mission, 1996. 	
 Mut‘ah aur Islam 	Lucknow: Sarfaraz Qawmi Press, 1933. 	
 Nafs-e-Mutmainnah   		(Pdf Hindi)
 Nigarshat-e-Sayyidul ‘ulama’. 	Lahore: Imamiah Mission, 1997. 	
 Nizam e tamaddun aurIislam   		(Pdf Urdu)
 Nizam-i zindagi, 4 vols. 	Lucknow: Al-Va‘iz Safdar Press, 1940. 	(Pdf Urdu)
 Qatil al-‘abrah 	Lucknow: Sarfaraz Quqmi Press, 1960. 	
 Qatilan-e-Husayn ka madhhab 	Lucknow: Sarfaraz Quqmi Press, 1932. 	(Pdf Urdu)
 Qur’an aur nizam-i hukumat 	Lucknow: Sarfaraz Quqmi Press, 1972. 	
 Qur’an kay bayan al-aqvami irshadat	Lucknow: Sarfaraz Quqmi Press, 1976. 	(Pdf Urdu)
 Qur’an-i majid kay andaz-i guftagu main ma‘yar-i tahzib va ravadari 	Lucknow: Sarfaraz Quqmi Press, 1976. 	(Pdf Urdu)
 Quran aur ittehad   		(Pdf Urdu)
 Radd-i Wahhabiyya 	Lucknow: Imamiyah Mission, np.	(Pdf English / Pdf Hindi / Pdf Urdu)
 Rahbar-i kamil: Savanih-i ‘Ali 	Lucknow: Sarfaraz Quqmi Press, 1961. 	
 Rahnumayan-i Islam 	Lucknow: Sarfaraz Quqmi Press, 1962. 	(Pdf Urdu)
 Rusul-i Khuda 	Lucknow: Sarfaraz Quqmi Press, 1961. 	
 Safar namah-yi Hajj	Lucknow: Nizami Press, 1977. 	(Pdf Urdu)
 Sahifaey Sajjadiya ki azmat   		(Pdf Urdu)
 Sahifah al-‘amal	Lucknow: np., 1939. 	
 Saman e aza   		(Pdf Urdu)
 Shab e shahadat   		(Pdf Hindi)
 Shadi khana abadi   		(Pdf Hindi)
 Shah ast Hussain deen panah ast Hussain   		(Pdf Hindi)
 ShahadateHussain aur uske karan   		(Pdf Hindi)
 Shaheed e Karbala ki yadgar ka azad hindostan se mutaleba   		(Pdf Urdu)
 Shahid-i insaniyat	Lahore: Imamiyah Mission Pakistan Trust, 2006. 	
 Shia ittehas ki sankshipt roop rekha    		(Pdf Hindi)
 Shiyat ka tarruf   		(Pdf Urdu)
 Shuja‘at kay misali karnamay	Lucknow: Sarfaraz Quqmi Press, 1954. 	
 Suluh Aur Jang		(Pdf Urdu)
 Ta‘ziahdari ki mukhalfat ka asal raz	Lucknow: Sarfaraz Quqmi Press, 1963. 	
 Tadhkirah-i huffaz-i shi‘a 	Lucknow: Sarfaraz Quqmi Press, 1935. 	
 Tadveen e hadees   		(Pdf Urdu)
 Tafsir fasl al-khatab. 8 vols 	Lahore: Misbah al-Qur'an Trust, 1986. 	
 Tahqeeq e Azan Assalat o khairum wa Aliyun Waliullah ki bahes   		(Pdf Urdu)
 Tahreef e Quran ki haqeeqat   		(Pdf Urdu)
 Tahrif-i Qur’an ki haqiqat 	Lucknow: Sarfaraz Quqmi Press, 1932. 	
 Taqiyah 	Lucknow: Sarfaraz Quqmi Press, 1952. 	(Pdf Hindi)
 Taqleed kya hai   		(Pdf Urdu)
 Tareekhe mazalime Najd ka eik khoonchakan waraq   		(Pdf Urdu)
 Tarikh-i Islam 4 vols. 	Lucknow: Sarfaraz Quqmi Press, 1961. 315 	
 Tarjuma wa Tafseer e Quran		
 Tazkerae Huffaze Shia   		(Pdf Urdu)
 The compilation of Nahjul-balagha    		(Pdf Urdu  /   English 
 Tijarat aur Islam 	Lucknow: Sarfaraz Quqmi Press, 1933. 	(Pdf Urdu)
 Usul aur arkan-i din 	Lucknow: Imamiyah Mission, 1973 	(Pdf Hindi)
 Usul-i din aur Qur’an 	Lahore: Imamiyah Mission, 1964. 	
 Usvah-yi Husayni	Lucknow: Imamiyah Mission, 1986. 	
 Va‘dah-yi jannat 	Lucknow: Sarfaraz Qawmi Press, 1979. 	
 Vujud-i hujjat 	Lucknow: Sarfaraz Qawmi Press, 1932. 	(Pdf Urdu)
 Waqaey Karbala se dars e ikhlaq   		(Pdf Urdu)
 Yad aur yadigar 	Lucknow: Sarfaraz Qawmi Press, 1968. 	
 Yazid aur jang-i Qustantaniyah 	Lucknow: Sarfaraz Quqmi Press, 1965. 	
 Zakir e Sham e Ghariban maulana Syed Kalb-e-Hussain Sahab Mujtahed (urf Kabban Sahab)   		(Pdf Urdu)
 Zikr-i Husayn 	Lucknow: Imamia Mission, np. 	
 Zindah savalat 	Aligarh University Press, 1971. 	
 Zindah-i javid ka matam 	Lucknow: Sarfaraz Qawmi Press, 1935. 	
 Zuljanah   		(Pdf Hindi)

Although only a small selection of the large number of published works by the prolific author, these works are representative of his thought.

Controversy 
He was opposed by some members of the Shia community for sections in the book Shaheed-e-insaniyat which mentioned the presence of water in the tents of Imam Hussain during the Battle of Karbala and also threw doubt the martyrdom of Ali Asghar by the arrow of Hurmula.

Shaheed-e-insaniyat was internally published by Idaar-e-Yaadgar-e-Husaini which had 300 members. Their purpose was to review, compile, edit and finally present a book on Karbala which could be acceptable to an international inter-sect readers group. The book was written in 1942 (1361 AH) by a team formed by all the Ulemas of all religion. Contributions from many of these men were then compiled in a book form by Ayatollah Sayyed Ali Naqi Naqvi. 

Initially 500 copies were printed for review by the members of the mentioned organization, who were asked to review and comment on the text. This draft version was released to the public, leading to the controversy. Naqvi was blamed, as the public thought he was the sole author of the draft.

Family 
He brought up his four brothers after the death of his father at a very early age. All of them were scholars of Shia Islam.

 Maulana Syed Murtaza Naqvi(1930-1994), Lucknow, India
 Maulana Syed Kazim Naqvi (1934-2018), chairman, Dean of the Faculty of Theology, Aligarh Muslim University, Aligarh, India
 Maulana Syed Baqir Naqvi(1938–Present), Dubai, UAE
 Maulana Syed Abdul Hasan Naqvi(1940-2001), Lucknow, India

His son, Professor Syed Ali Mohammad Naqavi was the Dean of the Faculty of Theology at Aligarh Muslim University, a position previously held by his uncle. Naqavi currently heads the Dara Shikoh Interfaith Center of Aligarh Muslim University. He has published at least 34 books on various topics.

References

External links
PhD Thesis of Syed Rizwan Zamir on Syedul Ulama Syed Ali Naqi Naqvi t.s.
Syed ul ulama hayat aur karname – By Salamat Rizvi
Video Majalis of Syed Ul Ulema Allama Ali Naqi Naqvi (Naqqan Sahib)

Ayatollah Syed ul-Ulema Ali Naqi Naqvi
1905 births
1988 deaths
Indian Shia Muslims
Indian Shia clerics
Ijtihadi family
Scholars from Lucknow
Academic staff of Aligarh Muslim University
Academic staff of the University of Lucknow